Ghelli is an Italian surname. Notable people with the surname include:

 Raimondo Ghelli, 18th-century Italian painter and engraver
 Giuliano Ghelli (1944–2014), Italian painter
 Roberto Ghelli (born 1942), Italian footballer

Italian-language surnames